Tece Creek is a creek in Mersin Province, Turkey. Its headwaters are around Fındıkpınarı in the Toros Mountains. In upper reaches it is also called Fındık Creek. Tece town (now a neighborhood of Mersin) is by the creek.

References

Rivers of Turkey
Rivers of Mersin Province